The Sevenmile Bridge is a Pratt deck truss bridge bringing a county road over the Rio Grande,  southwest of Creede, Colorado, United States. It was designed by engineer King Burghardt and is unusual for its cantilevered ends. It was built in 1935; it then carried State Highway 149. It has also been known as Bridge over Rio Grande River. It was listed on the National Register of Historic Places in 1985.

In 1981 ownership of the bridge was transferred to Mineral County. The bridge provides access to Marshall Park Campground.

References 

Road bridges on the National Register of Historic Places in Colorado
Bridges completed in 1935
Transportation buildings and structures in Mineral County, Colorado
National Register of Historic Places in Mineral County, Colorado
Truss bridges in the United States